Addictions: Volume 1 is the first compilation from Robert Palmer featuring his best-known songs, released in 1989 by Island Records.

Track listing
All songs by Robert Palmer, except where indicated.
 "Bad Case of Loving You (Doctor, Doctor)" (Remix) (John Moon Martin) — 3:15
 "Pride" — 4:05
 "Addicted to Love" (Edit) — 4:21
 "Sweet Lies" (Robert Palmer, Frank Blair, Dony Wynn) — 3:05
 "Woke Up Laughing" (Remix) — 4:06
 "Looking for Clues" (Remix) — 4:54
 "Some Guys Have All the Luck" (Jeff Fortang) — 3:06
 "Some Like It Hot" (Robert Palmer, Andy Taylor, John Taylor) — 5:05
 "What's It Take?" — 3:28
 "Every Kinda People" (Andy Fraser) — 3:26
 "Johnny and Mary" — 4:05
 "Simply Irresistible" — 4:18
 "Style Kills" (Robert Palmer, Gary Numan) — 4:16

Charts

Certifications

References

1989 greatest hits albums
Robert Palmer (singer) compilation albums
Island Records compilation albums